Tommy Calandro was an Olympic weightlifter for the United States.  His coach was Gayle Hatch.

Weightlifting achievements
Olympic Games team member (1984)

External links
Tommy Calandro - Hall of Fame at Weightlifting Exchange

American male weightlifters
Olympic weightlifters of the United States
Weightlifters at the 1984 Summer Olympics
Living people
Year of birth missing (living people)
Pan American Games medalists in weightlifting
Pan American Games bronze medalists for the United States
Weightlifters at the 1987 Pan American Games
20th-century American people